The haegeum is a traditional Korean string instrument, resembling a vertical fiddle with two strings; derived from the ancient Chinese xiqin. It has a rodlike neck, a hollow wooden soundbox, and two silk strings, and is held vertically on the knee of the performer and played with a bow.

The haegeum is one of the most widely used instruments in Korean music. The haegeum'''s range of expression is various despite having only two strings, with sounds ranging from sorrowful and sad to humorous. The haegeum is made using eight materials: metal, stone, silk, bamboo, gourd, clay, hide, and wood, and so it is called  (eight sounds).

The  is a modernized fiddle with four strings, used only in North Korea and in the Yanbian Korean Autonomous Prefecture in China.photo

The haegeum is a Korean musical instrument played with a wooden bow between two strings, standing in line with a large wooden block standing vertically on top of the ring box. The haegeum is also classified as a string instrument because it consists of two strings made of silk thread. However, it is classified as a wind instrument because it serves as a wind instrument that can make a continuous sound using a bow.  The haegeum has a unique tone, so it is characterized by a unique tone rather than matching with other wind or string instruments.

 History 
There are no records about the exact era when the haegeum was first introduced in Korea.

The way the haegeum is played changed dramatically since the Joseon Dynasty. Before middle Joseon period, musicians played the string in  method (placing and stopping with no pulling on strings like western bowed-string instrument), but since then they have begun to play in  method (pulling the string). Accordingly, it is possible to make a wide variety of sounds by pulling and releasing strings since it has no fingerboard.

To improve the acoustic ability of the haegeum, various modifications have been introduced since the 1960s. In 1965, Park Hun-bong and Kim Bun-gi developed a low-tune Haegeum, and in 1967 Kim Gisu made a small haegeum''.

See also
Erhu
Huqin
Kokyū
Korean music
Traditional Korean musical instruments

References

External links 
Haegum photo
Traditional Korean Instruments

Korean musical instruments
Huqin family instruments